Famalicense Atlético Clube (FAC) is a sports club from Vila Nova de Famalicão, Portugal. It has basketball, futsal, rink hockey, volleyball, badminton, snooker, gymnastics and chess departments.
The under 16 Basketball team recently reached the final of "Taça do Minho" losing to ATC by one point.

External links
 Official website 

Rink hockey clubs in Portugal
Sport in Vila Nova de Famalicão